FEIA may refer to:
Feia, a genus of gobies
Fluorescent enzyme immunoassay, a blood test to diagnose allergies